Year by year results for North Carolina State Wolfpack football, the football team representing North Carolina State University.

Seasons

Notes

References

 
NC State
NC State Wolfpack football seasons